In mathematics, a pseudofunctor F is a mapping between 2-categories, or from a category to a 2-category, that is just like a functor except that  and  do not hold as exact equalities but only up to coherent isomorphisms.

The Grothendieck construction associates to a pseudofunctor a fibered category.

See also 
Lax functor
Prestack (an example of pseudofunctor)
Fibered category

References 
C. Sorger, Lectures on moduli of principal G-bundles over algebraic curves

External links 
http://ncatlab.org/nlab/show/pseudofunctor

Functors